Percy Roderick Coleman (26 January 1897–20 April 1965) was a New Zealand mechanic, motor-cycle racer, businessman and aviator. He was born in Ngaere, Taranaki, New Zealand on 26 January 1897.

References

1897 births
1965 deaths
20th-century New Zealand businesspeople
New Zealand aviators